Gods in Color or Gods in Colour (original title in German: Bunte Götter – Die Farbigkeit antiker Skulptur  ("Painted gods – the polychromy of ancient sculpture") is a travelling exhibition of varying format and extent that has been shown in multiple cities worldwide. Its subject is ancient polychromy, i.e. the original, brightly-painted, appearance of ancient sculpture and architecture.

Concept 

The exhibition is based on the conclusions drawn from research on ancient polychromy, conducted especially by the Classical archaeologist Vinzenz Brinkmann since the early 1980s, based on earlier works by Volkmar von Graeve. Working together with Raimund Wünsche, the director of the Glyptothek at Munich, Brinkmann developed the concept for the exhibition, culminating in the original Munich show in 2003. It displayed copies of ancient sculpture in their reconstructed and painted appearance that had been produced during his studies, as well as new reconstructions created especially for the exhibition, in conjunction with the originals or comparable ancient sculptures. Soon, the exhibition began to travel to other cities in Germany and beyond.

Since 2007, the exhibition and underlying research has received support from a foundation created by the government of Bavaria, as well as private donations. After the original German catalogue produced for the 2003 Munich exhibition, new editions were issued for later showings, most recently for the 2020 one in Frankfurt. An English catalogue was published for the 2007-2008 showing in the Arthur M. Sackler Museum at Harvard University and more recently for the show in San Francisco (Legion of Honor (museum)). In 2007, the Colored Gods formed part of the exhibition Color of Life – Polychromy in Sculpture from Antiquity to the Present, at the Getty Villa in Los Angeles, with contributions in the respective catalogue.

Dates 

So far, the exhibit has been shown in the following locations:
 16. Dec. 2003 – 29. Feb. 2004: Glyptothek, Munich
 Ny Carlsberg Glyptotek, Copenhagen
 Vatican Museums, Rome
 11. Aug. – 20. Nov. 2005: Skulpturhalle, Basel
 2. Dec. 2005 – 26. Mar 2006: Allard Pierson Museum, Amsterdam
 2006: Archaeological Museum, Istanbul
 9. Jan. – 24. Mar. 2007: as Πολύχρωμοι Θεοί/Polychromoi Theoi, National Archaeological Museum, Athens
 4. Apr. – 1. Jul. 2007: Museum für Kunst und Gewerbe, Hamburg
 22. Sep. 2007 – 20. Jan. 2008: as Gods in Color. Painted Sculpture of Classical Antiquity, Arthur M. Sackler Museum at Harvard University, Cambridge (Massachusetts)
 6. Mar. – 23. Jun. 2008: Part of exhibition Color of Life – Polychromy in Sculpture from Antiquity to the Present, Getty Villa, Los Angeles
 8. Oct. 2008 – 15. Feb. 2009: Liebieghaus, Frankfurt am Main
 6. Mar. – 1. Jun. 2009: Antikensammlung, Schloss Wilhelmshöhe, Kassel
 18. Dec. 2009 – 18. Apr. 2010: Museo Arqueológico Regional de la Comunidad de Madrid, Madrid
 13. Jul. – 3. Oct. 2010: Antikensammlung in the Pergamonmuseum, Berlin
 9. Oct. 2010 – 30. Jan. 2011: as White Lies, Medelhavsmuseet, Stockholm
 6. Mar. – 31. Jul. 2011: Georg-August-Universität, Archaeological Institute, Göttingen
 29. Oct. 2011 - 20. May 2012: Heidelberg University
 28. June  - 28.October 2012: Kunstsammlungen, Ruhr University Bochum
 13. November 2012 - 17.March 2013: Kunsthistorisches Museum, Vienna
 11. Apr. 2014 - 10. Aug. 2014: Museum of Tübingen University, Tübingen
 22 Jan 2015 - 14 Jun 2015: Ashmolean Museum, Oxford
 11 Oct. 2016 - 8 Jan. 2017: Palacio de Bellas Artes, Mexico City
 28 Oct. 2017 - 7 Jan. 2018: Legion of Honor (museum), San Francisco
 30 Jan. 2020 - 26 Sept. 2021: as Bunte Götter - Golden Edition, Liebieghaus, Frankfurt am Main

Research and Reconstruction Objects (selection)
 West and East pediment of Aphaea Temple on Aegina 
 Archer in Scythian garment (3 Variants)
 Statue of Athena (2 Variants)
 Head of a warrior (2 Variants)
 Shield with boar as device
 Shield with eagle and serpent

Sculpture from the Athenian Acropolis
 Statue of the so-called Peplos Kore (3 Variants)
 Cuirassed Torso (2 Variants)
 So-called Chios Kore
 So-called Persian Rider
 Riace Bronzes

Sculpture from Attica 
 Grave Statue of Phrasikleia Kore
 Grave Stele of Aristion (2 Variants)
 Theseus and Antiope from Eretria (2 Variants)
 Grave Stele of Paramythion (2 Variants)

Sculpture from Delos
 So-called Small Herculaneum Woman
 Statue of a Muse (5 Variants)

Other sculpture from Greece
 Kouros of Tenea
 Sphinx from Thasos
 Bronzes from Quirinal (so-called Boxer at Rest and so-called Hellenistic Prince)

Sculpture from Pompeii
 So-called Winckelmann-Artemis (3 Variants)
 So-called Venus Lovatelli

Roman portraiture 
 Portrait of Emperor Caligula (3 Variants)

Elements from Greek Architecture 
 Antefix from the Temple of Aphaea
 Ionic capital from the Athenian Agora

Catalogues 
In German:
 Vinzenz Brinkmann, Raimund Wünsche (eds.): Bunte Götter. Die Farbigkeit antiker Skulptur. Staatliche Antikensammlungen und Glyptothek, Munich 2004. . [Original catalogue]
 Various editions coinciding with later showings
 Vinzenz Brinkmann, Andreas Scholl (eds.): Bunte Götter. Die Farbigkeit antiker Skulptur. Hirmer, Munich, 2010. 
 Vinzenz Brinkmann, Ulrike Koch-Brinkmann (eds.): Bunte Götter - Golden Edition. Die Farbigkeit antiker Skulptur. Prestel, Munich 2020.
In English:
 Vinzenz Brinkmann (ed.): Gods in Color - Painted Sculpture of Classical Antiquity, Biering & Brinkmann, Munich, 2007.  [Coinciding with Harvard showing]
  Roberta Panzanelli, Eike Schmidt, Kenneth Lapatin (eds.): The Color of Life: Polychromy in Sculpture from Antiquity to the Present, Getty Research Institute, Los Angeles, 2008.  [Catalogue for the L.A. exhibition, including sections on the Gods in Color exhibit]
 Vinzenz Brinkmann, Oliver Primavesi, Max Hollein: Circumlitio. The Polychromy of Antique and Medieval Sculpture. 2010.
 Vinzenz Brinkmann, Ulrike Koch-Brinkmann, Renée Dreyfus: Gods in Color - Polychromy in the Ancient World, Prestel, New York 2017.

Gallery

References

External links 

 Stiftung Archäologie/Bavarian Archaeology Foundation
 Bunte Götter – German website on the exhibit
 Gods in colors – website on the exhibition

Ancient Greek art
Ancient Greek sculpture
Visual arts exhibitions